Wang Seo, known by his title of Marquess Deokyang and later Duke Yangyang, was a Goryeo Royal Prince as the second son of King Sinjong and Queen Seonjeong, also the only younger brother of King Huijong. Through his third son, he would eventually become an ancestor of King Gongyang. In 1204, his father visited his manor, but died there not long after that. In 1211, he was exiled alongside Huijong by Choe Chung-heon (최충헌) to Ganghwa Island.

Family and ancestry

Close relatives
Older brother: Wang Yeong, King Huijong
Sister-in-law: Queen Seongpyeong of the Jangheung Im clan
Nephew: Duke Changwon
Nephew: Marquess Siryeong
Nephew: Duke Gyeongwon
Nephew: Grand Priest Wonjeong
Nephew: Grand Priest Chungmyeong
Niece: Queen Anhye
Niece: Princess Yeongchang
Niece: Princess Deokchang
Niece: Princess Gasun
Niece: Princess Jeonghui
Younger sister: Princess Heungdeok
Brother-in-law: Wang Chun
Younger sister: Princess Gyeongnyeong
Brother-in-law: Wang Jeong
Nephew: Wang Yeon
Nephew: Wang Jeon
Nephew: Wang Si
Issue:
Wang Wi (왕위) (d. 1216)
Wang Byeong (왕병)
Wang In, Duke Sian (왕인 시안공) (d. 1275)
Wang Hui, Duke Yeongan (왕희 영안공) (d. 1263)
Lady Wang of the Kaesong Wang clan (부인 개성 왕씨)

Ancestry

Descendants
Both of his eldest son and youngest son had no children. The descendants of his second and third sons were:
From second son, Wang Byeong:
Wang Hu (왕후)
Wang Yu (왕유)
Wang Hui (왕희)
From third son, Wang In, Duke Sian:
Wang Jeong (왕정 수사공)
Princess Jeongsin of the Gaeseong Wang clan (정신부주 왕씨) (regnal name Jeonghwa (정화궁주 or 정화원비)), first wife of King Chungnyeol
Wang Yeong, Marquess Seowon and Duke Yeongheon (왕영 서원후 영헌공), married Lady Sunan of Byeonhan State of the Hwangbo clan (변한국순안비 황보씨)
Royal Consort Jeongbi of the Kaeseong Wang clan (정비 개성 왕씨), third wife of King Chungseon of Goryeo
Wang Bun, Marquess Ikyang (왕분 익양후), married Lady Janggyeong of Jinhan State of the Miryang Park clan (진한국장경비 밀양 박씨)
Wang Yu, Marquess Sunhwa (왕유 순화후), married Lady Myeongye of Mahan State of the Icheon Sin clan (마한국명예비 이천 신씨)
Wang Gyun, Internal Prince Jeongwon (왕균 정원부원군)
Wang Hyang, Internal Prince Hakseong (왕향 학성부원군)
Wang Hwa, Prince Nampyeong (왕화 남평군)
Wang Geo, Prince Yeongpyeong (왕거 영평군)
Wang So, Internal Prince Ikwon (왕소 익원부원군)
Wang Jin, Prince Yeongwon (왕진 영원군)
Wang Gyeong (왕경)
Wang Min (왕민)
Wang Jeong, Internal Prince Pyeongan (왕정 평안부원군)
Wang Jong, Prince Gyeongpyeong (왕종 경평군)
Wang Hoe, Prince Bojeong (왕회 보정군)
Wang Gyeong (왕경)
Wang Gu (왕구)
Wang Hui, Prince Boseong (왕희 보성군)
Wang Yu, Grand Prince Gyeongchang (왕유 경창대군)
Wang Jeong, Prince Sunseong (왕정 순성군)
Prince Yeongan (영안군)
Wang Bak (왕박)
Wang Hwan, Prince Yeongheung (왕환 영흥군)
Wang San, Prince Sunpyeong (왕산 순평군)
Wang Hyeong (왕형)
Wang Geun (왕근)
Wang Yeon, Prince Ikheung (왕연 익흥군)
Wang Sin, Prince Bokan (왕신 복안군)
Wang Si, Prince Jeongan (왕시 정안군)
Wang Seon, Prince Bokgang (왕선 복강군)
Wang Jin (왕진)
Wang Bo, Prince Bokchang (왕보 복창군)
Wang Ja, Prince Bokwon (왕자 복원군)
Wang Jeon, Prince Seoheung (왕전 서흥군)
Wang Won (왕원)

References

External links
Duke Yangyang on Doosan Encyclopedia .
Duke Yangyang on Encykorea .

Korean princes
Year of birth unknown
Date of birth unknown
Year of death unknown
Date of death unknown
13th-century Korean people